The following is a list of the 363 communes of the Drôme department of France.

The communes cooperate in the following intercommunalities (as of 2020):
Communauté d'agglomération Arche Agglo (partly)
Montélimar Agglomération
Communauté d'agglomération Valence Romans Agglo
Communauté de communes des Baronnies en Drôme Provençale
Communauté de communes du Crestois et de Pays de Saillans Cœur de Drôme
Communauté de communes Dieulefit-Bourdeaux
Communauté de communes du Diois
Communauté de communes Drôme Sud Provence
Communauté de communes Enclave des Papes-Pays de Grignan (partly)
Communauté de communes Jabron-Lure-Vançon-Durance (partly)
Communauté de communes Porte de Dromardèche (partly)
Communauté de communes du Royans-Vercors
Communauté de communes du Sisteronais-Buëch (partly)
Communauté de communes Vaison Ventoux (partly)
Communauté de communes du Val de Drôme en Biovallée
Communauté de communes Ventoux Sud (partly)

References

Drome